Fanny Grace Plimsoll (1841–1918) was a British painter who was active in Canada between 1891 and 1913.

Plimsoll took part in the Montreal Association exhibition in 1892 and the World's Columbian Exposition in 1894. Her work is included in the collection of the National Gallery of Canada.

References

19th-century British women artists
20th-century British women artists
1841 births
1918 deaths